

Events 

 January–March 
 January 19 – (26 Jumada al-Awwal 1037 A.H.) The reign of Salef-ud-din Muhammad Shahryar as the Mughal Emperor, Shahryar Mirza, comes to an end a little more than two months after the November 7 death of his father, Jahangir, as Sharyar's older brother, Shihab defeats him in battle. Prince Shihab-ud-Din Muhammad Khurram takes the name Shah Jahan and sentences Shahryar and other members of the court to death.
 January 23 – After being incarcerated and blinded on orders of his brother, former Mughal Emperor Shahryar Mirza is put to death, along with his nephews, co-ruler Dawar Bakhsh, and Princes Garshasp, Tahmuras and Hoshang. 
 February 3 – In what is now the South American nation of Chile, the indigenous Mapuche lay siege to the Spanish colonial settlement of Nacimiento. The Spnaish captain and a force of 40 men are able to hold out until reinforcements arrive two days later, but the attackers take muskets and two cannons.
 February 5 – The Chongzhen Era begins in Ming dynasty China after the October 2 ascension of Zhu Youjian, the Chongzhen Emperor, on the first day of the Chinese New Year, and the Tianqi era formally ends.
 February 10 – King Gustavus Adolphus of Sweden issues an order bringing an end to the "foolishness and insanity" ("dårskap och galenskap") of religious visionary Margareta i Kumla, prohibiting Swedes from making pilgrimages to see her on pain of imprisonment, and threatening her with incarceration if she continues to preach about her visions from the angels.
 February 14 – The coronation of Shah Jahan as ruler of the Mughal Empire takes place in Agra. 
 March 1 – Writs issued in February, by King Charles I, require every county in England (not just seaport towns) to pay ship tax by this date.
 March 17 – Oliver Cromwell makes his first appearance in the English Parliament, as Member for Huntingdon.

 April–June 
 April 6 – Damat Halil Pasha is fired from his position as Grand Vizier of the Ottoman Empire by Sultan Murad IV after failing again to suppress the rebellion started by Abaza Mehmed Pasha or to win the war of the Ottomans against Persia. Halil is replaced by Gazi Hüsrev Pasha.
 April 8 – A decree of the Sacred Congregation of Rites of the Roman Catholic Church is made to prohibit the veneration of saints whose sanctity has not been declared by the Holy See.
 April 21 – Generalissimo Albrecht von Wallenstein of the Holy Roman Empire is made Admiral of the Baltic Sea by Emperor Ferdinand II. 
 April 26 – Cardinal Girolamo Grimaldi-Cavalleroni is appointed as the Governor of Rome by Pope Urban VIII.
 May 5– Catholic League Field Marshal Johann Tserclaes, Count of Tilly, succeeds in taking control of the German city of Stade after a long siege. Tilly allows the remaining 3,500 Danish and English defenders safe passage out of Germany, and captures most of the Duchy of Bremen except for the city of Bremen itself, which he turns to next.
 May 13– 
In North America, Matthew Cradock is elected by shareholders as the first Governor of the Massachusetts Bay Company. 
Thirty Years' War: As a result of its refusal to accept the capitulation of Franzburg, the siege of Stralsund is begun by Field Marshals Hans Georg von Arnim-Boitzenburg and Wallenstein's of the Holy Roman Imperial Army, and lasts until August 4. 
 May 21– (17 Ramadan 1037 AH) Muhsin ibn Husayn, Emir of Mecca and King of Hejaz, surrenders control to Ahmad ibn Abd al-Muttalib.
 May 31– Mehmed III Giray, the Khan of Crimea, is forced to leave after an invasion of 4,000 Cossacks and a four week siege of the capital Bakhchysarai. The attack is led by Mykhailo Doroshenko, who is killed in the battle.
 June 7 – King Charles I reconvenes the English Parliament, and accepts the Petition of Right as a concession to gain his subsidies.

 July–September 
 July 9 – Prince Minyedeippa assassinates his father, Anaukpetlun, King of Burma upon the death of his father. Minyedeippa is arrested by the palace guards a year later and turned over to Anaukpetlun's brother, Thalun, for execution. 
 August 4 – Thirty Years' War: With the help of Danish and Swedish reinforcements, Stralsund is able to resist Wallenstein's siege until the landing of a Danish army, led by Christian IV of Denmark, forces Wallenstein to raise the siege, and move his army to confront the new threat.
 August 10 – The Swedish 64-gun sailing ship Vasa sinks on her maiden voyage, in Stockholm Harbor.
 August 22 – Sultan Agung of Mataram (located on the island of Java sends a fleet of ships to besiege the Dutch fort at Batavia (now Jakarta, Indonesia). The siege fails after four months.
 August 23 – George Villiers, the first Duke of Buckingham, is assassinated by John Felton.
 September 2 – Thirty Years' War – Battle of Wolgast: Wallenstein defeats Christian IV of Denmark's army.
 September 6 – Puritans settle Salem, which will later become part of Massachusetts Bay Colony.
 September 7–8 – Eighty Years' War – Battle in the Bay of Matanzas: Dutch admiral Piet Hein captures 16 ships of the Spanish treasure fleet. The immense booty taken brings in over 11 million guilders, part of which is used to fund the entire army of the Dutch Republic for eight months.
 September 8– In a persecution of Christians in Japan, 21 Christian converts are executed on the same day.

 October–December 
 October 22 – Abaza Mehmed Pasha surrenders to Ottoman forces, ending the Abaza rebellion.
 October 28 – The siege of La Rochelle ends with the surrender of the Huguenots.
 November 29 – English Army Lieutenant John Felton, who stabbed the Duke of Buckingham to death on August 23, is hanged at Tyburn prison, becoming a beloved martyr in his hometown of Portsmouth.
 December 3 – The attempt by the Mataram Sultanate to drive the Dutch East India Company from the western part of the island of Java fails after 103 days.
 December 11 – Muhammad Imaduddin I becomes the Sultan of Maldives and reigns for the next 29 years. 
 December 12 – At the age of 15, Chetthathirat is crowned as the new King of Thailand upon the death of his father, Intharacha III. Prince Chetthathirat takes the regnal name of Borommaracha II and is killed less than a year later.
 December 16 – In the Joseon Kingdom of Korea, O Yun-gyeom becomes the new Yeonguijeong (Chief of the State Council, similar to Prime Minister) during the reign of King Injo.

 Date unknown 
 The War of the Mantuan Succession breaks out over Mantua and Montferrat. The war is fought between the Duke of Savoy, who is supported by Spain, and the Duke of Nevers, who is supported by France.
 William Harvey publishes Exercitatio Anatomica de Motu Cordis et Sanguinis in Animalibus in Frankfurt, containing his findings about blood circulation.
 Publication of Sir Edward Coke's Institutes of the Lawes of England begins with A Commentary upon Littleton. This will remain an influential legal text on both sides of the Atlantic for three centuries.
 The Collegiate School, the oldest surviving educational institution in the United States, is established.
 The first black slaves arrive in Dutch Manhattan.

Births

January–March 
 January 1 – Christoph Bernhard, German composer (d. 1692)
 January 3 – Alvise II Mocenigo, Doge of Venice (d. 1709)
 January 8 – François-Henri de Montmorency, duc de Luxembourg, French general (d. 1695)
 January 10
 John Bennet, English landowner and politician (d. 1663)
 Jan Theunisz Blanckerhoff, Dutch Golden Age marine painter (d. 1669)
 January 12 – Charles Perrault, French folklorist (d. 1703)
 January 14 – Sir Roger Bradshaigh, 1st Baronet, English politician (d. 1684)
 January 19 – Charles Stanley, 8th Earl of Derby, English noble (d. 1672)
 January 20 – Henry Cromwell, 4th son of Oliver Cromwell and Elizabeth Bourchier (d. 1674)
 January 23 – Johann Reinhard II, Count of Hanau-Lichtenberg, German aristocrat (d. 1666)
 January 30 – George Villiers, 2nd Duke of Buckingham, English statesman (d. 1687)
 February 1 – Jan Hackaert, Dutch painter (d. 1685)
 February 5 – César d'Estrées, French Catholic cardinal (d. 1714)
 February 14 – Valentine Greatrakes, Irish faith healer (d. 1682)
 February 24 – Paolo Spinola, 3rd Marquis of the Balbases and 3rd Duke of San Severino and Sesto (d. 1699)
 February 25 – Claire-Clémence de Maillé-Brézé, French noblewoman (d. 1694)
 March 2 – Cornelis Speelman, Governor-General of the Dutch East Indies (d. 1684)
 March 10
 Marcello Malpighi, Italian biologist and physician (d. 1694)
 François Girardon, French sculptor (d. 1715)
 March 12 – Jacques Frémin, French Jesuit missionary to Canada (d. 1691)
 March 17 – Daniel Papebroch, Flemish Jesuit hagiographer (d. 1714)
 March 20 – Sir John Hobart, 3rd Baronet, English landowner and politician (d. 1683)
 March 24 – Sophie Amalie of Brunswick-Lüneburg (d. 1685)

April–June 
 April 2 – Constantin Christian Dedekind, German poet, dramatist and composer (d. 1715)
 April 16 – Cornelis Evertsen the Younger, Dutch admiral (d. 1679)
 April 22 – Georg Matthäus Vischer, Austrian cartographer (d. 1696)
 April 23
 Johann van Waveren Hudde, Dutch mathematician (d. 1704)
 Johannes Hudde, burgomaster (mayor) of Amsterdam (d. 1704)
 April 24 – William Beecher, English politician (d. 1694)
 April 25 – Sir William Temple, 1st Baronet, English statesman and essayist (d. 1699)
 May 7 – Étienne Le Hongre, French sculptor (d. 1690)
 May 8 – Angelo Italia, Sicilian Jesuit architect (d. 1700)
 May 9 – Sir William Gardiner, 1st Baronet, English Member of Parliament (d. 1691)
 May 15
 Dominique Bouhours, French Jesuit priest (d. 1702)
 Carlo Cignani, Italian painter of the Bolognese and the Forlivese school (d. 1719)
 May 17 – Ferdinand Charles, Archduke of Austria (d. 1662)
 May 24 – Marek Sobieski, Polish noble (szlachcic) (d. 1652)
 June 1 – John Dugdale, English herald in the College of Arms (d. 1700)
 June 4 – Christopher Delphicus zu Dohna, Swedish diplomat (d. 1668)
 June 5 – Arthur Sparke, English lawyer and politician (d. 1677)
 June 15 – Walter Marshall, British theologian (d. 1680)
 June 21 – Alexander Parker, English Quaker preacher and author (d. 1689)
 June 30 – Miguel de Molinos, Spanish mystic (d. 1696)

July–September 
 July 11 – Tokugawa Mitsukuni, Japanese warlord (d. 1701)
 July 12 – Henry Howard, 6th Duke of Norfolk (d. 1684)
 July 17 – Richard Powle, English politician (d. 1678)
 August 12 – Gabriel Gerberon, French Jansenist monk (d. 1711)
 August 20 – Emmanuel Philibert, Prince of Carignano, Prince of Savoy (d. 1709)
 August 29
 Jan Pieter Brueghel, Flemish Baroque painter (d. 1664)
 John Granville, 1st Earl of Bath, English royalist statesman (d. 1701)
 September 7 – Sir William Courtenay, 1st Baronet, English politician (d. 1702)
 September 21 – Barend Graat, Dutch painter (d. 1709)
 September 23 – David Klöcker Ehrenstrahl, German artist (d. 1698)

October–December 
 October 12
 Hermann of Baden-Baden, Imperial field marshal and president of the Hofkriegsrat (d. 1691)
 William Christopher of Baden-Baden, margrave of Baden and canon at Cologne (d. 1652)
 October 21 – Úrsula Micaela Morata, Spanish writer (d. 1703)
 October 23 – Henry Eyre, English politician and lawyer (d. 1678)
 October 24 – Lucrezia Barberini, Italian noblewoman (d. 1699)
 November 20 – Matthias Sention Jr., Connecticut settler (d. 1728)
 November 30 (baptised) – John Bunyan, English writer (d. 1688)
 December 2 – Johannes Rothe, Dutch preacher (d. 1702)
 December 10 – Jan Baptist Martin Wans, Flemish painter (d. 1684)
 December 12 – Anna Salome of Manderscheid-Blankenheim, German abbess of Thorn Abbey, later abbess of Essen Abbey (d. 1691)
 December 19 – Charlotte of the Palatinate, German noble (d. 1631)
 December 21 – Samuel Capricornus, Czech composer (d. 1665)
 December 25 – Noël Coypel, French painter (d. 1707)
 December 26 – John Page, American politician (d. 1692)

Probable 
 Josias Fendall, Colonial governor of Maryland (d. 1687)
 Anne Greene, English domestic servant and execution survivor (d. 1659)
 Jacob Isaacksz van Ruisdael, Dutch landscape painter (d. 1682)

Deaths 

 January 12 – Francisco Ribalta, Spanish painter (b. 1565)
 January 21 – Gregor Aichinger, German composer (b. c. 1565)
 January 23 – Shahryar, fifth son of the Mughal emperor Jahangir (b. 1605)
 January 29 – Philip Ernest, Count of Hohenlohe-Langenburg (1610–1628) (b. 1584)
 March 12 – John Bull, English composer (b. c. 1562)
 March 29 – Tobias Matthew, English Archbishop of York (b. 1546)
 April 17 – Rudolf Christian, Count of East Frisia, ruler of East Frisia (b. 1602)
 June 8 – Rudolph Goclenius, German philosopher (b. 1547)
 July 11 – David Origanus, German astronomer (b. 1558)
 July 13 – Robert Shirley, English adventurer (b. c. 1581)
 July 18 – John Frederick, Duke of Württemberg (1608–1628) (b. 1582)
 August 6 – Johannes Junius, Mayor of Bamberg, Germany (b. 1573)
 August 20 – Sir Charles Morrison, 1st Baronet, Member of the Parliament of England (b. 1587)
 August 23 – George Villiers, 1st Duke of Buckingham, English statesman (b. 1592)
 September 23 – Amalia von Hatzfeld, Swedish-Finnish governor (b. 1560)
 September 25 – Magdalene of Bavaria, Consort of Wolfgang William, Count Palatine of Neuburg (b. 1587)
 September 30 – Fulke Greville, 1st Baron Brooke, English writer (b. 1554)
 October 16 – François de Malherbe, French poet and critic (b. 1555)
 October 17 – John Frederick, Duke of Saxe-Weimar (b. 1600)
 November 15 – Roque Gonzales, Paraguayan missionary (b. 1576)
 November 16 – Paolo Quagliati, Italian composer (b. c. 1555)

References 

 
Leap years in the Gregorian calendar